Thomas Baynes may refer to:

 Thomas Mann Baynes (1794–1876), English artist and lithographer
 Thomas Spencer Baynes (1823–1887), English philosopher